Leena Maria "Awa" Peisa (born 16 March 1979) is a Finnish keyboard player. Her former bands include Lordi, Punaiset Messiaat and Dolchamar. Currently, she plays in Lordi's ex-drummer's Kita's band "Sampsa Astala & Qma".

Biography 
Leena Maria Peisa was born in Vantaa although she spent her teenage years in Porvoo. She has been playing the piano since she was six years old. She took to playing the synthesizer in her teens. Her first band was Punaiset Messiaat which she joined in autumn 1994. While in Punaiset Messiaat she used the stage name "Lende Mielihyvä". Mielihyvä is the Finnish word for pleasure. After Punaiset Messiaat disbanded in 1998, Peisa concentrated on her education and studied Social Studies at the University of Helsinki.

In 2003, she joined the Esperanto band Dolchamar, and in 2005 was invited to join Lordi by drummer Kita to replace the keyboardist Enary. In Lordi, she takes on the persona of an unearthly vampire countess. The name Awa comes from Be Aware. On the band's website she is said to have many other names. Some Greek television channels claim to have videos and photos of the band without stage make-up.
On 25 July it was announced through the band's website that she is leaving the band after their concert on 11 August 2012.

In February 2018, Leena joined the Finnish rock band Dingo, replacing former keyboardist Pete Nuotio.

Discography

With Punaiset Messiaat

Albums 
 Back in Bu$ine$$ (1995)
 Lemmentykki ('Cannon of Love') (1996)
 Älä osta; varasta ('Don't buy; steal') (1997)

EPs 
"Punainen Iktivisto" (1992)
 Punk on pop ('Punk Is Hip') (1996)
 Tuu mun luo ('Come to Me') (1996)
 Hornan hovin häät ('A Wedding at the Abode of Evil Spirits') (1997; includes a horror comic book)

Singles 
 Onko tää rakkautta?! ('Is This Love?!') (1996)
 Oma rotta ('My Own Rat') (1996)

With Dolchamar

Albums 
  (The Rebel Sound) (2005)

With Lordi

Albums 
The Arockalypse (2006)
Deadache (2008)
Babez for Breakfast (2010)

Singles and EPs 
Hard Rock Hallelujah (2006) FIN #1, GER #5, UK #25, IRL #4
Who's Your Daddy? (2006) FIN #1, GER #33
Would You Love a Monsterman? (2006) (2006)
It Snows in Hell (2006)
They Only Come Out at Night (2007) FIN #6
Beast Loose in Paradise (2008)
Bite It Like a Bulldog (2008)
Deadache (2008)
This Is Heavy Metal (2010)

With Dingo

Singles 
Tähtenä taivaalla (2018)

References

External links 
 ..::DOLCHAMAR::.. official website
 Lordi – official website

1979 births
Living people
People from Vantaa
Lordi members
Finnish women musicians
Finnish heavy metal keyboardists
Finnish rock musicians
Finnish songwriters
21st-century women musicians
Eurovision Song Contest winners
Eurovision Song Contest entrants of 2006
Eurovision Song Contest entrants for Finland
Women in metal